Abdul Rauf Mughal is a Pakistani politician who had been a Member of the Provincial Assembly of the Punjab from August 2018 till January 2023. Previously, he had been a Member of the Provincial Assembly of the Punjab, from 1993 to 1996 and again from May 2013 to May 2018.

Early life and education
He was born on 1 January 1947 in Gujranwala.

He has completed intermediate level education.

Political career
He was elected to the Provincial Assembly of the Punjab as a candidate of Pakistan Muslim League (N) (PML-N) from Constituency PP-88 (Gujranwala-XII) in 1993 Pakistani general election. He received 30,531 votes and defeated Khalid Aziz Lone, a candidate of Pakistan Peoples Party (PPP).

He was re-elected to the Provincial Assembly of the Punjab as a candidate of PML-N from Constituency PP-88 (Gujranwala-XII) in 1997 Pakistani general election. He received 30,594 votes and defeated Jamshed Ahmad Chaudhry, a candidate of PPP.

He was re-elected to the Provincial Assembly of the Punjab as a candidate of PML-N from Constituency PP-94 (Gujranwala-IV) in 2013 Pakistani general election. He received 47,744 votes and defeated Khawaja Khalid Aziz Lone, a candidate of Pakistan Tehreek-e-Insaf (PTI).

He was re-elected to Provincial Assembly of the Punjab as a candidate of PML-N from Constituency PP-58 (Gujranwala-VIII) in 2018 Pakistani general election.

References

Living people
Punjab MPAs 2013–2018
1947 births
Pakistan Muslim League (N) MPAs (Punjab)
Punjab MPAs 1993–1996
Punjab MPAs 1997–1999
Punjab MPAs 2018–2023